Heinz Sielmann (2 June 1917 – 6 October 2006) was a German wildlife photographer, biologist, zoologist and documentary filmmaker.

Early life
Heinz's father was physician Paul Sielmann.

His first film, in 1938, was a silent movie on bird life in East Prussia and the Memelland. Further work was interrupted by World War II. He was initially stationed in occupied Poland in Poznań (then "Posen"), as an instructor at a radio-communications training unit of the Luftwaffe. Sielmann gained a degree in biology and specialized in zoology, in 1940, at the University of Posen, at that time a Germanized university. There he met Joseph Beuys, who was his trainee, and they both attended lectures in biology and zoology. Later he was stationed in Crete, where he worked in cinematographically. Following time as a prisoner of war of the British in Cairo and London he started editing the material from Crete in London for a three-part documentary.

Career
After the war he began widely recognized work for the Educational Film Institute of the Federal Republic of Germany. His feature film about woodpeckers, Carpenters of the Forest (Zimmerleute des Waldes, 1954; UK title: Woodpecker) was a huge success in the United Kingdom when broadcast by the BBC in 1955 at the behest of Sir Peter Scott. It earned Sielmann the nickname "Mr Woodpecker".

His work includes the movies Lords of the Forest (better known in the USA under its title Masters of the Congo Jungle) (1959), the English version narrated by Orson Welles; Galapagos – Dream Island in the Pacific (1962); Vanishing Wilderness (1973); and The Mystery of Animal Behavior.

During the collaboration on some National Geographic wildlife documentaries in the late 1960s he met Walon Green with whom he worked as additional photographer on the Academy Award-winning documentary The Hellstrom Chronicle about insects in 1971. Sielmann was awarded the Royal Geographical Society's Cherry Kearton Medal and Award in 1973. He was also cinematographer on the American wildlife documentary, Birds do it..., Bees do it... in 1974.

He was mentioned in the 1974 Monty Python's Flying Circus episode "Blood, Devastation, Death, War, and Horror".

In 1994 he established the Heinz Sielmann-Stiftung, which successfully reintroduced beavers and otters in Germany.

His first television work for German Television began in 1956 and his series Expeditionen ins Tierreich (Expeditions into the Animal Kingdom), broadcast on national German television from 1965 to 1991 in 152 installments, made him a household name.

Death and legacy
Sielmann died aged 89 in Munich and was buried in the German town of Duderstadt.

A Google Doodle honoring his 101st birthday appeared on 2 June 2018.

Bibliography
 1959: Windows in the Woods, Harper & Bros, New York, ASIN B0007DUDS4
 1959: My Year with the Woodpeckers, Barrie and Rockliff, London
 1981: Wilderness expeditions, Franklyn Watts, New York,

References

External links

International Herald Tribune Europe - German naturalist and documentary filmmaker Heinz Sielmann dies
Heinz Sielmann Stiftung

1917 births
2006 deaths
People from Mönchengladbach
20th-century German zoologists
Photographers from North Rhine-Westphalia
German documentary filmmakers
Knights Commander of the Order of Merit of the Federal Republic of Germany
Luftwaffe personnel of World War II
German prisoners of war in World War II held by the United Kingdom